Alan Douglas Hill (born April 22, 1955) is a Canadian former professional ice hockey centre who played eight seasons in the National Hockey League (NHL) for the Philadelphia Flyers. On February 14, 1977, Hill made his NHL debut for the Philadelphia Flyers and scored two goals and three assists in a 6–4 victory against the St. Louis Blues. Hill set the NHL record for most points (five) in a debut, including scoring twice in the first period (0:36) and (11:33) against goaltender Yves Bélanger.

Career
Hill started his NHL career with the Philadelphia Flyers in 1977. He retired from hockey after the 1988–89 AHL season.

On February 14, 1977, Hill made his NHL debut for the Flyers. On that night, he tallied two goals and three assists for five points. His performance set a new record for most points by a player in his first NHL game (a 6-4 Philadelphia victory over the St. Louis Blues). 

Since retiring, Hill has worked as a scout for the Flyers.

Career statistics

References

External links
 
 Meltzer, Bill Great Moments: Al Hill's Record-Breaking Debut From Philadelphiaflyers.com Retrieved 2–3–11.

1955 births
Canadian ice hockey centres
Canadian ice hockey coaches
Hershey Bears players
Ice hockey people from British Columbia
Living people
Maine Mariners players
Moncton Alpines (AHL) players
Nanaimo Clippers players
New York Rangers coaches
Philadelphia Flyers players
Philadelphia Flyers scouts
Sportspeople from Nanaimo
Springfield Indians players
Undrafted National Hockey League players
Victoria Cougars (WHL) players